"Who Do You Love" is a song by American DJ duo the Chainsmokers featuring Australian pop rock band 5 Seconds of Summer, released on February 7, 2019, through Sony Music. It is the acts' first collaboration and follows their December 2018 singles "Hope" and "Lie to Me", respectively. The song serves as the lead single from the Chainsmokers' third studio album World War Joy. The music video was released on March 25, 2019. In April 2021, an early demo of the song intended for Demi Lovato's 2017 album Tell Me You Love Me surfaced online.

Promotion
Both the Chainsmokers and 5 Seconds of Summer posted clips on social media leading up to the announcement, with 5 Seconds of Summer appearing walking through a "psychedelic landscape" and the Chainsmokers sitting in a studio talking about their lack of inspiration. An audio clip was posted on February 5, featuring what edm.com called a "radio-friendly vocal harmony" by 5 Seconds of Summer.

Music video
The music video was released on March 25, 2019. In the music video, the Chainsmokers perform in a Battle of the Bands against 5 Seconds of Summer. They play in comparison to see which band is the best. The two bands start performing in a concert. In the bridge, 5 Seconds of Summer frontman Luke Hemmings crowd surfs, before the Chainsmokers member Andrew Taggart does the same, jumping from the stage roof. In the end, the stage explodes because of the tension between both bands.

Charts

Weekly charts

Year-end charts

Certifications

References

2019 singles
2019 songs
The Chainsmokers songs
5 Seconds of Summer songs
Song recordings produced by Oak Felder
Songs written by Andrew Taggart
Songs written by Ashton Irwin
Songs written by Calum Hood
Songs written by Luke Hemmings
Songs written by Michael Clifford (musician)
Songs written by Talay Riley
Songs written by Oak Felder
Songs written by Sean Douglas (songwriter)
Songs written by William Zaire Simmons